Moshnino is a rural locality (a selo) in Slednevskoye Rural Settlement, Alexandrovsky District, Vladimir Oblast, Russia. The population was 136 as of 2010. There are 2 streets.

Geography 
Moshnino is located 11 km northeast of Alexandrov (the district's administrative centre) by road. Sivkovo is the nearest rural locality.

References 

Rural localities in Alexandrovsky District, Vladimir Oblast